Group A of the 2012 Fed Cup Europe/Africa Zone Group II was one of two pools in the Europe/Africa Zone Group II of the 2012 Fed Cup. Four teams competed in a round robin competition, with the top team and the bottom team proceeding to their respective sections of the play-offs: the top teams played for advancement to Group I, while the bottom team faced potential relegation to Group III.

Finland vs. Montenegro

South Africa vs. Denmark

Finland vs. South Africa

Denmark vs. Montenegro

Finland vs. Denmark

South Africa vs. Montenegro

See also
Fed Cup structure

References

External links
 Fed Cup website

2012 Fed Cup Europe/Africa Zone